The “Registration of Overseas Supplier of Imported Scrap Materials“ is required for Non-Chinese companies for importing industrial waste and recycling parts into China. The application has to be submitted at the AQSIQ (General Administration of Quality Supervision, Inspection and Quarantine of the People's Republic of China; Chinese: 中华人民共和国国家质量监督检验检疫总局). The registration is mandatory for all Non-Chinese exporters. Aim of this registration is to monitor the import of potential environmental harmful material and ensure that no material is imported into China that are not in compliance with the Chinese environment standards. 
If companies are not registered, parts will be detained in customs and no import process is possible. In addition to the registration of the exporting companies, the parts have to be registered with the CCIC (China Certification & Inspection Group; Chinese 中国检验认证集团), and, furthermore, these parts will be accordingly inspected.

Products requiring registration 
The following products require this registration
scrap metal
recyclable plastics
recyclable paper 
recyclable textiles
scrap electronics
wood waste

See also
General Administration of Quality Supervision, Inspection and Quarantine
Customs clearance in China

References

External links 
 Official Website

Safety codes
Foreign trade of China
Export and import control
Environmental standards
Recycling in China